Frickson Rafael Erazo Vivero (born 5 May 1988) is a retired Ecuadorian professional footballer who played as a centre back for Club 9 de Octubre. He is a member of the Ecuador national team.

Club career

El Nacional
Erazo began his professional playing career at El Nacional, where he spent six seasons.  He then joined Barcelona SC in January 2012.

Barcelona SC
He made his Barcelona SC debut on 2 February 2012 against Deportivo Cuenca and won 3–1. He scored his first goal for the club against LDU Quito on 29 April 2012 in a 2–2 draw.   He helped Barcelona SC become Ecuadorian Serie A champions that season, the club's first league title since 1997.  This league title was also the first honour in Erazo's career.

Flamengo
In January 2014, Erazo moved to Brazilian side Flamengo.  He made his debut on 2 February 2014 in a 5-2 Campeonato Carioca win over Macaé, but was sent off during the match.  Erazo played a further five Campeonato Carioca matches (the annual football championship of Rio de Janeiro) matches for Flamengo, helping them to the state title.

Grêmio
On 17 January 2015 it was confirmed Erazo would join Grêmio on loan for an entire year.

On 9 December 2015, it was confirmed that Erazo came to terms with Grêmio and parted ways due to economical problems of the team.

Atlético Mineiro
On 2 January 2016, it was confirmed that Erazo would be joining Atlético Mineiro.

Barcelona SC
In mid 2018, Erazo returned to Barcelona SC. However he was not able to play due to an inconvenience with Atlético Mineiro (at that time the club who owned his sports rights). On 19 February 2019 his agent announced, that the player would be registered for the 2019 season. However, the player had not yet made his debut nine months after joining the club and went out to medias and said, that he was very surprised by the situation.

Retirement
After a spell at 9 de Octubre, Erazo announced his retirement from football on 13 February 2021.

International career
Erazo made his debut for the Ecuador national football team on 20 April 2011 in a friendly match against Argentina  Erazo scored his first goal for Ecuador on 7 June 2011 in a 1–1 draw against Greece played at Citi Field, New York City, United States.  Erazo was selected for Ecuador's squad to take part in the 2011 Copa América held in Argentina.  He played in all three group games, but with Ecuador failing to win any, they were eliminated at the first stage.

He has made 45 international appearances and was in Ecuador's 23 men squad for the 2014 World Cup.

International goals
Scores and results list Ecuador's goal tally first.

Honours
Barcelona SC
Serie A: 2012

Flamengo
Campeonato Carioca: 2014

Atlético Mineiro
Campeonato Mineiro: 2017

9 de Octubre 
Ecuadorian Serie B: 2020

References

External links

1988 births
Living people
Ecuadorian footballers
Ecuadorian expatriate footballers
Ecuador international footballers
Sportspeople from Esmeraldas, Ecuador
C.D. El Nacional footballers
C.D. Técnico Universitario footballers
Barcelona S.C. footballers
Campeonato Brasileiro Série A players
CR Flamengo footballers
Grêmio Foot-Ball Porto Alegrense players
Clube Atlético Mineiro players
CR Vasco da Gama players
Ecuadorian expatriate sportspeople in Brazil
Expatriate footballers in Brazil
2011 Copa América players
2014 FIFA World Cup players
2015 Copa América players
Copa América Centenario players
Association football defenders